Events from the year 1557 in France

Incumbents
 Monarch – Henry II

Events
January – Harsh winter weather continues
24 July – Edict of Compiègne
10 August – Battle of St. Quentin

Births

Full date missing
Jean de Biencourt de Poutrincourt et de Saint-Just, nobleman (died 1615)

Deaths

1 September – Jacques Cartier, explorer (born 1491)

Full date missing
Jacques d'Annebaut, cardinal
Nicolas Bachelier, surveyor and architect (born 1485)
Charlotte Guillard, French printer (born c. 1480s)
Matthieu Ory, Dominican theologian and inquisitor (born 1492)
Valérand Poullain, Calvinist minister (born 1509?)
Philibert Babou, cryptographer (born c.1484)

See also

References

1550s in France